The 2012 Major League Lacrosse season is the 12th season of the league. The season began on April 28, 2012 and concluded with the Chesapeake Bayhawks winning the championship game on August 26, 2012 over the Denver Outlaws 16-6.

Milestones & events

Team movement

On January 21, 2011, Commissioner David Gross announced that Charlotte, North Carolina and Columbus, Ohio, had been approved as expansion teams for the 2012 season. Gross also announced that, with the adding of two more teams, (to bring the total to eight) the league would return to a fourteen-game season in 2012.

Standings 

W = Wins, L = Losses, PCT = Winning Percentage, GB = Games Back of first place, GF = Goals For, 2ptGF = 2 point Goals For, GA = Goals Against, 2ptGA = 2 point Goals Against

Final

All Star Game 

June 30, 2012 Old School 18-17 (SO)Young Guns  at  FAU Stadium. MVP Stephen Berger

Playoffs
The Warrior Championship Weekend took place on Saturday August 25 & Sunday August 26 at Harvard Stadium, Boston MA.  Ben Rubefor (Chesapeake) named Bud Light Championship weekend MVP.

Annual awards

References

External links
Official Site

12
Major League Lacrosse